The 2020–21 Longwood Lancers men's basketball team represented Longwood University in the 2020–21 NCAA Division I men's basketball season. The Lancers, led by third-year head coach Griff Aldrich, played their home games at Willett Hall in Farmville, Virginia as members of the Big South Conference. They finished the season 12-17, 10-10 to finish in 5th place. They defeated UNC Asheville in the quarterfinals of the Big South tournament before losing in the semifinals to Winthrop. They received an invitation to the CBI where they lost in the quarterfinals to Pepperdine.

Previous season
The Lancers finished the 2019–20 season 14–18, 9–9 in Big South play to finish in fourth place. They lost in the quarterfinals of the Big South tournament to Hampton.

Roster

Schedule and results

|-
!colspan=12 style=| Non-conference regular season

|-
!colspan=12 style=| Big South tournament
|-

|-
!colspan=12 style=| CBI
|-

|-

Source

References

Longwood Lancers men's basketball seasons
Longwood Lancers
Longwood Lancers men's basketball
Longwood Lancers men's basketball
Longwood